Masuma is a feminine given name of Arabic origin, which translates to "innocent"; as well as a masculine name with Japanese origin, which translates to "increase, kindness". 

Most notably this name was applied to Masuma e Qum, known more commonly as Fatimah bint Musa (c. 790 AD–816 AD), daughter of the seventh Twelver Shia Imam, Musa al-Kazim.

People with the given name Masuma 
 Masuma Anwar, Pakistani singer-songwriter, pediatric doctor, and musician
 Masuma Begum (1902–1990), Indian politician, social worker, and feminist
 Masuma Esmati-Wardak, Afghan writer and politician
 Masuma Hasan, Pakistani diplomat, chairperson of Pakistan Institute of International Affairs
 Masuma Rahman Nabila (born 1985), Bangladeshi television presenter, model and actress
 Masuma Sultan Begum (?–c. 1509), the Queen consort of Ferghana Valley and Samarkand as the fourth wife of Emperor Babur
 Masuma Sultan Begum (daughter of Babur) (c. 1508–?), Mughal princess and the daughter of the first Mughal emperor, Babur

Other uses 
 Masuma Dam, a gravity dam located in Chiba Prefecture, Japan

See also 
 Masoumeh (disambiguation), the Persian variation of Masuma
 Masumabad (disambiguation) (Masuma -bad), a disambiguation page for a place name in Iran
 Mami (given name), a feminine Japanese given name

Arabic feminine given names
Japanese masculine given names